Castle Thunder, located between what is now 17th Street and 18th Street on northern side of E Cary Street in Richmond, Virginia, was a former tobacco warehouse, located on Tobacco Row, converted into a prison used by the Confederacy to house civilian prisoners, including captured Union spies, political prisoners and those charged with treason during the American Civil War. A large number of its inmates were sentenced to death. Even though the inmates were sometimes allowed boxes of medicine and other supplies, the prison guards had a reputation for brutality.

The prison's most notorious commandant was Captain George W. Alexander. As a Confederate soldier fighting in Maryland, Alexander was captured in 1861. While awaiting execution by the Union Army, he escaped and fled to Richmond. Once in Richmond, Alexander took command of the Castle Thunder Prison. Security at the prison was intense under Alexander. Prisoners are said to have complained of Alexander's brutality.

Those held in the prison as spies, criminals, or charged with treason were said to have been treated with unnecessary brutality by the guards. The unsavory reputation of the prison obliged the Confederate House of Representatives in 1863 to order an investigation of the commandant, Capt. George W. Alexander, who had been accused of "harshness, inhumanity, tyranny, and dishonesty". Alexander was eventually cleared of the charges, partially by citing the hard-bitten character of the inmates as justification for his behavior.

Among its many notable occupants was Union officer William Jackson Palmer (1836–1909). In 1862, he was captured while scouting after the Battle of Antietam within Confederate lines in civilian clothes while gathering information for General George McClellan. When questioned he gave his name as W.J. Peters, and claimed to be a mine owner on an inspection trip. While the Confederates did not know he was a spy, his circumstances were suspicious and he was detained and sent to Richmond, Virginia, for detention at Castle Thunder. He was set free in a prisoner exchange and rejoined his regiment in February, 1863.

Another held for a time in this prison was Dr. Mary E. Walker, the only woman who ever received the Medal of Honor.

After the Union forces captured Richmond, they used the prison for similar  purposes. Among those known to have been incarcerated there in this later period was Mollie Bean, a woman who had served for two years in the 47th North Carolina and was twice wounded in action. She had pretended to be a man simply in order to join the Confederate Army, but her Union captors suspected her of being a spy.

President Jefferson Davis is reported to have said for every Confederate sailor hanged he would hang a Union soldier of corresponding rank, chosen by lot from among the thousands of prisoners in the Richmond tobacco warehouse.

A fire in 1879 destroyed the Civil War–era prison Castle Thunder in its entirety.

References

History of Richmond, Virginia
American Civil War prison camps
Defunct prisons in Virginia
Virginia in the American Civil War
1861 establishments in Virginia
1865 disestablishments in Virginia